Adham Hadiya (born 12 February 1985) is a former Arab-Israeli footballer who is currently the manager of Maccabi Bnei Reineh.

Honours
Liga Leumit
Winner (1): 2021-22

External links
Profile on One.co.il 

1985 births
Living people
Arab citizens of Israel
Arab-Israeli footballers
Israeli footballers
Israel under-21 international footballers
Maccabi Petah Tikva F.C. players
Hakoah Maccabi Amidar Ramat Gan F.C. players
Maccabi Ahi Nazareth F.C. players
Hapoel Kfar Saba F.C. players
Maccabi Ahi Nazareth F.C. managers
Footballers from Nazareth
Liga Leumit players
Israeli Premier League players
Association football midfielders
Israeli football managers